Krebs Ridge is an east–west ridge which forms the north wall of Gurling Glacier and terminates at the southwest head of Smith Inlet, on the east coast of Palmer Land, Antarctica. It was mapped by the United States Geological Survey in 1974, and was named by the Advisory Committee on Antarctic Names for William N. Krebs, a United States Antarctic Research Program biologist at Palmer Station in 1972.

References

Ridges of Palmer Land